Liberty Square is a station of the Tbilisi Metro on the Akhmeteli–Varketili Line. Before 1991, it was named Lenin Square (ლენინის მოედანი)

The metro station is surrounded by the Galleria Tbilisi shopping centre which is a multi-level shopping mall featuring a play area, a movie theatre & a food court.

It is located close to Freedom Square at the southern end of Rustaveli Avenue. The station was opened on 6 November 1967 to extend the original Rustaveli–Didube line. The station was renovated in 2006.

See also
 List of Tbilisi metro stations

References

External links
 Freedom Square station page at Tbilisi Municipal Portal

Tbilisi Metro stations
Railway stations opened in 1967
1967 establishments in Georgia (country)